Roland Guillas (23 September 1936 – 9 November 2022) was a French professional footballer who played as a midfielder. He made nine appearances for the France national team from 1958 to 1962.

References

External links
 

1936 births
2022 deaths
Sportspeople from Lorient
French footballers
Association football midfielders
France international footballers
Ligue 1 players
FC Girondins de Bordeaux players
AS Saint-Étienne players
Grenoble Foot 38 players
FC Rouen players
FC Lorient players
Angoulême Charente FC players
FC Lorient managers
20th-century French people